Nassau, the name of several places in the State of New York, may refer to:

Nassau (village), New York
Nassau (town), New York
Nassau County, New York
Nassau Island, former name of Long Island

See also
 Nassau (disambiguation)